"Royal Garden Blues" is a blues song composed by Clarence Williams and Spencer Williams in 1919. Popularized in jazz by the Original Dixieland Jazz Band, it has since been recorded by numerous artists and has become a jazz standard. The song is considered one of the first popular songs based on a riff.

Clarence Williams and Spencer Williams (no relation) collaborated on two other songs as well: "I Ain’t Gonna Give Nobody None o’ This Jelly Roll" and "Yama Yama Blues." It is speculated that Spencer was the actual composer of the tunes, and that Clarence was given shared credit for publishing the song.

See also
List of pre-1920 jazz standards

Notes 

1919 songs
Blues songs
1910s jazz standards
Songs written by Spencer Williams
Songs written by Clarence Williams (musician)